Brandon Dorlus (born March 22, 2001) is an American football defensive end for the Oregon Ducks.

Early years
Dorlus originally attended Calvary Christian High School in Clearwater, Florida before transferring to Deerfield Beach High School in Deerfield Beach, Florida. As a senior, he had 74 tackles, 11 sacks and an interception that he returned for a touchdown. He originally committed to Virginia Tech to play college football before changing to the University of Oregon.

College career
Dorlus played in nine games as a true freshman at Oregon in 2019, recording five tackles and one sack. In 2020, he played in all seven games with one start and had 14 tackles and one sack. Dorlus became a starter in 2021, starting 13 of 14 games and finishing with 25 tackles and 2.5 sacks. He returned to Oregon as a starter in 2022.

References

External links
Oregon Ducks bio

Living people
Players of American football from Florida
American football defensive ends
American football defensive tackles
Oregon Ducks football players
2001 births